The fifth series of Line of Duty, consisting of six episodes, began broadcasting on 31 March 2019 on BBC One. The series follows the actions of Superintendent Ted Hastings (Adrian Dunbar), DI Kate Fleming (Vicky McClure) and DS Steve Arnott (Martin Compston) as they investigate an Organised Crime Group with links to missing undercover officer DS John Corbett (Stephen Graham). Anna Maxwell Martin stars in episodes five and six as DCS Patricia Carmichael. Supporting characters include underboss Lisa McQueen (Rochenda Sandall) and the special counsel to the police and crime commissioner Gill Biggeloe (Polly Walker).

Cast

Main cast 
 Stephen Graham as DS John Corbett
 Martin Compston as DS Steve Arnott
 Vicky McClure as DI Kate Fleming
 Adrian Dunbar as Superintendent Ted Hastings
 Anna Maxwell Martin as DCS Patricia Carmichael
 Rochenda Sandall as Lisa McQueen

Supporting cast 

 Maya Sondhi as PC Maneet Bindra
 Polly Walker as Gill Biggeloe
 Tony Pitts as DCS Lester Hargreaves
 Aiysha Hart as DS Sam Railston
 Patrick FitzSymons as Mark Moffatt
 Susan Vidler as DSU Alison Powell
 Ace Bhatti as PCC Rohan Sindwhani
 Elizabeth Rider as DCC Andrea Wise
 Sian Reese-Williams as Sergeant Jane Cafferty
 Richard Pepple as Sergeant Kyle Ferringham
 Taj Atwal as PC Tatleen Sohota
 Gregory Piper as Ryan Pilkington
 Tomi May as Miroslav Minkowicz
 Tommy Jessop as Terry Boyle
 Andrea Irvine as Roisin Hastings
 Maanuv Thiara as Vihaan Malhotra
 Alastair Natkiel as Lee Banks
 Laura Elphinstone as DI Michelle Brandyce
 Natalie Gavin as PS Tina Tranter
 Rosa Escoda as Amanda Yao
 Peter De Jersey as Rossport
 Caroline Koziol as Mariana
 Richard Sutton as PC Bloom

Episodes

Reception
Despite less positive reviews than the previous series, series 5 was still ranked highly among critics. Review aggregator website Rotten Tomatoes holds an approval rating for series 5 at 90%, with an average rating of 8.40/10, based on 29 reviews. The website's critics consensus reads: “Line of Duty's sterling ensemble all maintain a stiff upper lip, but audiences' limbs will be quavering throughout this tense fifth season that dives deep into moral murk.” On the review aggregator website Metacritic, the series has a score of 88 out of 100 based on 5 critics. 

Radio Times drama editor Eleanor Bley Griffiths wrote: "With epic interrogation scenes, surprise betrayals, grisly murders, untold secrets, massive twists... " Pat Stacey of The Irish Independent wrote: "Episode by episode, the plot is thickening, like soup that's been left sitting on a hot stove for too long." Rachel Cooke of the New Statesman was less complimentary in her review, suggesting that Mercurio struggled to give the audience a logical resolution – leading her to call series five “Jed Mercurio’s ropiest bit of work ever sent our way.” Brian Donaldson of The List had solid praise for the actors, but felt the series's plot was somewhat vague; he was critical of the script, stating: “The writing leaves many of them discussing the gravest of matters as though they're reading the contents on the back of a shampoo sachet.”

Ratings
Series 5 saw a major increase in viewing ratings from previous series. By the May 2019 series finale, it was the BBC’s most watched programme of year. The show was reported to have had an average peak of 12.34 to 13.67 million viewers per episode.

References

Line of Duty
2019 British television seasons